Lind is a surname of both Swedish and Estonian origin. In Swedish, it is the word for the linden tree. In Estonian, it is the word for bird.

Geographical distribution
As of 2014, 36.1% of all known bearers of the surname Lind were residents of the United States (frequency 1:17,107), 26.2% of Sweden (1:644), 8.0% of Germany (1:17,143), 7.7% of Denmark (1:1,255), 3.9% of Norway (1:2,278), 3.1% of Finland (1:3,054), 2.3% of Canada (1:27,037), 2.0% of Australia (1:20,530), 1.5% of Estonia (1:1,539) and 1.4% of Austria (1:10,630).

As of 1 January 2021, 369 men and 407 women have the surname Lind in Estonia. Lind is 112th most common surname for men in Estonia, and the 112th most common surname for women. The surname Lind is most commonly found in Hiiu County, where there 17.86 per 10,000 inhabitants of the county bear the surname.

In Sweden, the frequency of the surname was higher than national average (1:644) in the following regions:
 1. Gävleborg County (1:368)
 2. Dalarna County (1:421)
 3. Uppsala County (1:451)
 4. Norrbotten County (1:454)
 5. Östergötland County (1:480)
 6. Värmland County (1:505)
 7. Västerbotten County (1:511)
 8. Västernorrland County (1:519)
 9. Kalmar County (1:542)
 10. Södermanland County (1:597)
 11. Jämtland County (1:602)
 12. Västmanland County (1:627)
 13. Jönköping County (1:642)

Film, stage and television
Arvi Lind (born 1940), Finnish television news presenter
Dagny Lind (1902–1992), Swedish film actress
Della Lind (1906–1999), Austrian/American actress and operatic soprano
Emily Alyn Lind (born 2002), American actress
John Lind (female impersonator) (1877–1940), Swedish female impersonator, singer and dancer
Letty Lind (1861–1923), English actress, dancer and acrobat
Sarah Lind (born 1982), Canadian actress
Traci Lind (born 1968), American film actress

Music
Bob Lind (born 1942), American folk music singer/songwriter
Espen Lind (born 1971), Norwegian musician
Eva Lind (born 1966), Austrian operatic soprano
Jenny Lind (1820–1887), Swedish opera singer
Jon Lind (fl. 1970–2000s), American songwriter and performer
Mark Lind (fl. 2000s), American singer/songwriter
Olle Lind (fl. 1970–1980s), Swedish musician
Zach Lind (fl. 1990–2000s), American musician
Sebastian Lind (born 1988), Danish musician

Politics
Albert Lind (1878–1964), Australian politician, Country Party member of the Victorian Legislative Assembly
Amanda Lind (born 1980), Swedish politician
Greg Lind (born 1957), American politician, Democratic Party member of the Montana Senate
Ivar Lykke Falch Lind (1870–?),  Norwegian jurist and politician for the Conservative Party
James F. Lind (1900–1975), Democratic member of the U.S. House of Representatives
Jim Lind (politician) (1913–1980), Liberal party member of the Canadian House of Commons
John Lind (politician) (1854–1930), American politician
Nathalie Lind (1918–1999), Danish politician
Rikke Lind (born 1968), Norwegian politician for the Labour Party

Science, medicine and technology
Artur Lind (1927–1989), Estonian molecular biologist
David A. Lind (1918–2015), American physicist and mountain climber
Don L. Lind (1930–2022), American astronaut
James Lind (1716–1794), Scottish pioneer of naval hygiene
Jens Lind (1874–1939), Danish apothecary and botanist
Samuel C. Lind (1879–1965), American radiation chemist

Sport
Adam Lind (born 1983), American baseball player
Andreas Lind (1922–1982), Danish sprint canoer
Angelita Lind (born 1959), Puerto Rican track and field athlete
Björn Lind (born 1978), Swedish cross country skier
Carl Johan Lind (1883–1965), Swedish athlete in 1912 Summer Olympics
Carl Lind (baseball) (1903–2001), American baseball player
Caroline Lind (born 1982), American rower
Dustin Lind, American baseball coach
Folke Lind (1913–?), Swedish football player
Haakon Lind (1906–1955), Norwegian boxer who competed in the 1928 Summer Olympics
Harry Lind (1906–1986), Scottish international rugby union player
Hasse Pavia Lind (born 1979), Danish athlete
Jack Lind (born 1946), American Major League Baseball player
Jim Lind (born 1947), American football player and coach
Joan Lind (1952–2015), American rower
Johan Lind (born 1942), Norwegian speed skater
José Lind (born 1964), former Major League Baseball player
Juha Lind (born 1974), Finnish ice hockey forward
Heino Lind (1931–2008), Estonian sport sailor 
Mak Lind (born 1988), Swedish–Lebanese football manager and former player
Lasse Lind (born 1981), Finnish football player
Mads Lind (born 1980), Danish handball player
Mikael Lind (born 1972), Swedish professional ice hockey player
Pasi Lind (born 1961), Finnish judo athlete
Raimo Lind, Finnish curler
Sofia Lind (born 1975), Swedish cross-country skier
Victoria Lind (born 1985), New Zealand cricketer

Writing
Angus Lind (born 1944), American columnist for the New Orleans Times-Picayune
Idar Lind (born 1954), Norwegian author and playwright
Jakov Lind (1927–2007), Austrian-British writer
Melva Lind (1903–1997), American professor and author
Michael Lind (born 1962), American political writer
William S. Lind (born 1947), American expert on military affairs and pundit on cultural conservatism

Other
Baron von Lind (born 1937), American artist, born Jerry Lind
David Lind (1938–1995), American crime figure
DeDe Lind (born 1947),  American glamour model
Earl Lind (1874–?), American author and advocate for androgynes
Edmund George Lind (1829–1909), English-born American architect
Henry Curtis Lind (born 1921), American lawyer
James Lind (Royal Navy officer) (1765–1823), officer of the Royal Navy
Johanna Lind (born 1971), Miss Sweden in 1993
John Lind (barrister) (1737–1781), English barrister, political activist, and pamphleteer
Lily Lind (1882–1916), New Zealand nurse who died in World War I
Lizzy Lind af Hageby  (1878–1963), Swedish countess, feminist, writer, and anti-vivisection activist
Martin Lind (born 1944), Swedish Lutheran bishop
Norman Lind (1920–1985), British/Norwegian military and government official 
Wallace L. Lind (1887–1940), officer in the United States Navy

See also 
Linde (disambiguation)
Lynd (disambiguation)

References

Danish-language surnames
English-language surnames
Estonian-language surnames
Norwegian-language surnames
Swedish-language surnames